The Science of Diabetes Self-Management and Care  is a peer-reviewed academic journal that publishes papers in the field of Endocrinology. The journal's editor is James Fain, PhD, RN, BC-ADM, FAAN (University of Massachusetts-Dartmouth). It has been in publication since 1980 and until 2021 was titled The Diabetes Educator. It is currently published by SAGE Publications in association with the Association of Diabetes Care & Education Specialists.

Scope 
The Science of Diabetes Self-Management and Care publishes original articles on topics such as patient care and education, clinical practice and clinical research. The multidisciplinary journal takes the view of diabetes education as represented by nurses, dieticians, physicians and other professionals. The Science of Diabetes Self-Management and Care aims to serve as a reference for the science and practice of diabetes management.

Abstracting and indexing 
The Science of Diabetes Self-Management and Care is abstracted and indexed in, among other databases:  SCOPUS, and the Social Sciences Citation Index. According to the Journal Citation Reports, its 2014 impact factor is 1.792, ranking it 98 out of 128 journals in the category ‘Endocrinology & Metabolism’. and ranking it 52 out of 145 journals in the category ‘Public, Environmental, and Occupational Health’.

References

External links 
 
 AADE Official website

SAGE Publishing academic journals
English-language journals